Igor Khanukovich Yusufov (born 12 June 1956) is a former Russian energy Minister who served during Vladimir Putin's first term as President. He is Founder and Chairman of Fund Energy ("Fond Energia") , an investment vehicle focusing on operating companies in energy, oil and gas, mining and infrastructure in Russia and Europe. In 2012, media reports linked Fund Energy to a potential purchase of the Coryton Refinery in Essex, England.

Education and early life

1979-1991
Yusufov graduated from Novocherkassk Polytechnic Institute, then worked for "Mosenergo", USSR’s major power plant and later spent four years in Cuba as the technology expert at Havana Thermal Power Plant construction site. Following this he continued his academic studies and graduated from the Foreign Trade Academy.

Government service

1991
As a Foreign Trade Academy graduate Yusufov entered the civil service.

He was appointed officer of the Committee for the Protection of Russia's Economic Interests  reporting to the Vice-President Alexander Rutskoy, one level below the President of the ex-USSR. When this post was in opposition to President Yeltsin, the committee was dissolved, but Yusufov moved to Chair of Deputy Minister of Foreign Economic Relations, with responsibility in promoting International Trade.

1994
Yusufov was  appointed as Director General of state and private enterprise “RV-Trading”.

1996

The functions of "RV-Trading" were integrated to the parent state-owned company. The Prime Minister Viktor Chernomyrdin recommended to Yusufov his return to Government service at the post of Deputy Minister of Industry with oversight of Gold and diamond recovery.

1997—2000
Yusufov worked as Deputy General Director then as General Director of Goskomrezerv (from 1999 renamed- “Federal Agency for State Reserves, Rosrezerv”) thus being responsible for Russia’s mineral reserves. This State agency reporting to the Prime Minister manages and withholds state strategic reserves in case of war and natural disasters in the protected storage system across the country.

2001–2011
In the early days of Vladimir Putin’s first Presidency, Yusufov became Minister of Energy for the Russian Federation (2001 - 2004).

Vladimir Putin appointed Yusufov to the post of Minister of Energy in 2001. Till late 2011 he served as Special Envoy of the Russian President for International Energy Cooperation, Ambassador at Large of the Russian Ministry of Foreign Affairs whereby the Minister was profiled across the Global Energy Players from U.S. Policy Makers to the Saudi King and OPEC opening to the world Russia's Energy resources.

Retirement from Government Service and Current Business Activity 
Since 2011, Igor Yusufov has been active exclusively as a businessman and investor, notably in energy, renewables and mining projects through his private equity company “Fund Energy”. “Fund Energy” is one of the leading investors in energy industry. The majority of the group’s projects are focused on exploration and extraction of energy resources and development of renewable energy projects  .

Timeline
1979–1984: Engineer at Mosenergo.
1984–1988: Head of Expert Group at the Havana thermal power plant (Cuba).
1988–1991: Foreign Trade Academy, Moscow, Foreign Economic Relations Economist
1991–1992: Administration of the President of the Russian Federation Deputy Chairman of the Committee for Economic Interests of Russia
1992-1993: Deputy Minister of Foreign Economic Relations of Russia
1994–1996: Minority shareholder and Director General of public-private joint company “RV-Trading”
1996–1997: Deputy Industry Minister of the Russian Federation.
1998–2001: Chairman of the Russian Federal Agency for State Reserves.
2001–2004: Minister of Energy of the Russian Federation.
2001-2004: Board Director of RAO UES of Russia; Board Director of Transneft.
2002-2004: Chairman of the Board of Directors of OJSC Rosneft Oil Company and Transnefteproduct.
2003–2013: Member of the Board of Directors of Gazprom.
2004–2011: Special Presidential Envoy for International Energy Cooperation, Ambassador at Large of the Russian Ministry of Foreign Affairs, non-governmental, non-staff and advisory roles.
2011–present: private investment activity via Fund Energy, within oil and gas, mining, renewable and alternative energy industries .

Awards and titles
Ambassador Extraordinary and Plenipotentiary of the Russian Ministry of Foreign Affairs (2005).
Order "For Merit to the Fatherland", IV Class (2006)

References

Reuters article, December 2014

1956 births
Living people
People from Derbent
Russian politicians
1st class Active State Councillors of the Russian Federation
Energy ministers of Russia
Ambassador Extraordinary and Plenipotentiary (Russian Federation)
Recipients of the Order "For Merit to the Fatherland", 4th class
Gazprom people